Abralia andamanica is a species of enoploteuthid cephalopod native to the Indian Ocean and Pacific Ocean.  It is known from Australia, Indonesia, Japan and Hawaii. It is associated with shelf waters, and will rise to the upper water column at night to feed. Females spawn eggs 0.9–1.5 mm in diameter in gelatinous strings.

References

Abralia
Molluscs described in 1896
Taxa named by Edwin Stephen Goodrich